Svetoslav Sakadzhiyski (born 1 April 1987) is a Bulgarian footballer currently playing for Malesh Mikrevo as a forward.

References

Bulgarian footballers
1987 births
Living people
PFC Marek Dupnitsa players
FC Malesh Mikrevo players
Association football forwards